Brebeuf Jesuit Preparatory School (BJPS) is a private college-preparatory school founded by the Jesuits and located on the northwest side of Indianapolis.  It is a part of the Midwest Province of the Society of Jesus and geographically located within the Roman Catholic Archdiocese of Indianapolis.

The school is not operated by the archdiocese.

History

In 2019, Charles C. Thompson, the Archbishop of Indianapolis, stated that the school would no longer be entitled to identify as Catholic, because administrators disobeyed him when renewing the contract of a teacher in a same-sex marriage. On September 23, the Holy See temporarily suspended Thompson's decree.

Demographics
The demographic breakdown of the 816 students enrolled for the 2020–2021 school year was:
Native American/Alaskan – 0%
Hawaiian/Pacific islanders – 0.2%
Asian - 4.4%
Black/African American – 15.4%
Hispanic – 6.4%
White – 66.2%
Multiracial – 7.4%

Athletics
The school has 29 athletic teams, ranging from cross country to the newest addition, men's volleyball.  In 2009, Brebeuf Jesuit completed construction of the $7 million Mark G. Kite Wellness Center.  The  facility houses 2 weight rooms, 3 locker rooms, team meeting rooms, training room, gym, and athletic offices.
 2000 boys' basketball state champs (3A)  
 2004, 2007 girls' basketball state champs (3A)
 2010, 2011 boys' golf state champs
 2006 girls' golf state champs
 1979, 1980, 1981, 1983, 1984 girls' tennis state champs  
 2003, 2005, 2009, 2013, 2021 girls' volleyball state champs  
 1991 boys' hockey state champs (1A), 2001 boys' hockey state champs (2A), 2013 boys' hockey state champs (4A)
 2021, 2022 boys' soccer state champs (2A)
 2015 girls' soccer state champs (2A)

Notable alumni

Fred Glass – Indiana University Athletic Director and former partner at Baker and Daniels.
Radley Haddad - baseball coach
Alan Henderson (1991) – retired basketball player
Christopher L. Hodapp (1977) – Author and filmmaker
Jim Hogshire (1976) – author
James Marten (2002) – retired American football player.
Ta'Shia Phillips – retired basketball player
Kevin Sumlin. (1982) – football coach
John Daniel Tinder (1968) – Former federal judge for the United States Court of Appeals for the Seventh Circuit (2007–2015)

See also
 List of high schools in Indiana

References

External links
 

Schools in Indianapolis
Private high schools in Indiana
Jesuit high schools in the United States
Catholic secondary schools in Indiana
Educational institutions established in 1962
IHSAA Conference-Independent Schools
Circle City Conference schools
1962 establishments in Indiana